Tragic Corner is a bluff rising to about 750 m and marking the northeast end of Boulding Ridge, located between Todd Glacier and McClary Glacier on Fallières Coast. So named by United Kingdom Antarctic Place-Names Committee (UK-APC) because Thomas J. Allan and John Fraser Noel died in the vicinity on a sledge journey from Stonington Island in May 1966.

Cliffs of Graham Land
Fallières Coast